X47 or X-47 may refer to:

 Northrop Grumman X-47A Pegasus, a Northrop Grumman unmanned aircraft
 Northrop Grumman X-47B, a Northrop Grumman carrier-based unmanned aircraft
 Northrop Grumman X-47C, a proposed stealth unmanned aircraft